Richard Eugene Norton (November 16, 1943 – July 25, 2013) from Louisville, Kentucky was an American collegiate and  professional football quarterback who played college football at the University of Kentucky and professionally with the American Football League (AFL)'s Miami Dolphins (1966–1969), and one game for the National Football League (NFL)'s Green Bay Packers (1970).  He died of natural causes on July 25, 2013.

Norton holds the distinction of throwing the last professional touchdown pass at Wrigley Field. It came on a 29-yard pass to John Hilton in the fourth quarter of a 35-17 Chicago Bears victory over Norton's Packers on December 13, 1970.

See also

 List of American Football League players

References

1943 births
2013 deaths
American football quarterbacks
Green Bay Packers players
Kentucky Wildcats football players
Miami Dolphins players
Players of American football from Louisville, Kentucky
American Football League players